The Toyota FZ engine was a 24-valve,  DOHC straight-6 internal combustion engine manufactured by Toyota to replace the F-series engine. It was used primarily in SUVs because of its large displacement, smoothness, ruggedness and torque.

Technical data
The 1FZ had only two variants available: the 1FZ-F and the 1FZ-FE. The only significant difference between the two was the inclusion of electronic fuel injection on the 1FZ-FE, whereas the 1FZ-F used a carburetor.

Starting in 1998, the fuel injected version (1FZ-FE) was updated in certain non-US markets. This version of the engine received many updates over the previous version such as a redesigned head, more compact pistons, updated throttle body, an improved intake manifold with longer intake runners, 4 nozzle fuel injectors to improve fuel atomization and direct ignition (via a wasted spark set-up with three dual outlet coils); the engine pictured here is that variant discernible by the intake manifold and lack of distributor.

Also, a de-rated LPG version was built for the 7FG/7FZ series forklifts.

Usage
The 1FZ-F and -FE were used in the following vehicles:

 1992–2009 Toyota Land Cruiser (FZJ7x)
 1992–2007 Toyota Land Cruiser (FZJ80)
 1998–2007 Toyota Land Cruiser (FZJ100, FZJ105)
 1995–1997 Lexus LX 450 (1FZ-FE only)
 Toyota 5FG/5FD series forklifts
 Toyota 7FG/7FD series forklifts

See also
List of Toyota engines

References

Fz
Straight-six engines
Gasoline engines by model